Juan Luis Morera Luna (born December 19, 1978), best known as his stage name Wisin, is a Puerto Rican reggaeton rapper, singer and record producer, best known as a member of the reggaeton duo Wisin & Yandel. Wisin is noted for his unique and aggressive style of rapping.

Career 
Wisin met Yandel in school. They began performing as a duo in the late 1990s and made their album debut in 2000 with Los Reyes del Nuevo Milenio. They later made the jump to a major label in 2003 with Mi Vida... My Life, their first for Universal subsidiary Machete Music. Pa'l Mundo then catapulted them to mainstream success in 2005. Subsequently, Wisin & Yandel established their own label, WY Records, and presented an affiliate group, Los Vaqueros.

In November 2013, after the duo's Líderes tour, the duo went into hiatus, but although rumors saying their split was because of differences between them, Yandel denied those rumors and confirmed they are not disbanded.

Wisin released his first solo album El Sobreviviente in 2004, and ten years later, in 2014, his second solo studio album, El Regreso del Sobreviviente was released. Wisin is currently working with Prince Royce on their Power and Love tour.

Wisin & Yandel reunited in 2018 and released their tenth studio album after spending five years apart. The new album is called "Los Campeones del Pueblo / "The Big Leagues".

On July 11, 2018, Telemundo announced Wisin as a coach on La Voz (U.S.). Wisin joins Luis Fonsi, Carlos Vives and Alejandra Guzmán as coaches on the Spanish-language version of NBC singing-competition The Voice.

Personal life 
Wisin is married to Yomaira Ortiz Feliciano. The couple married on July 26, 2008, in Wisin's hometown of Cayey, Puerto Rico after four years together. They have three children, Yelena, born  and Dylan Luna, born  and Victoria, born on August 29, 2016, with Patau syndrome, but died on September 30.

Discography

Studio albums

Singles

Featured singles

Promotional singles and other charted songs

Album appearances 
The following songs are not singles or promotional singles and have not appeared on an album by Wisin.

Music videos

Filmography

Awards and nominations

References

External links 

 

1978 births
Living people
21st-century Puerto Rican male singers
Puerto Rican reggaeton musicians
Spanish-language singers of the United States
People from Cayey, Puerto Rico
Sony Music Latin artists
Latin music songwriters
Reggaeton record producers